

Regular season

Season standings

Record vs. opponents

Notable transactions 
 June 13, 1903: The White Stockings traded a player to be named later to the Washington Senators for Ducky Holmes. The White Stockings completed the deal by sending Davey Dunkle to the Senators on July 20.

Roster

Player stats

Batting

Starters by position 
Note: Pos = Position; G = Games played; AB = At bats; H = Hits; Avg. = Batting average; HR = Home runs; RBI = Runs batted in

Other batters 
Note: G = Games played; AB = At bats; H = Hits; Avg. = Batting average; HR = Home runs; RBI = Runs batted in

Pitching

Starting pitchers 
Note: G = Games pitched; IP = Innings pitched; W = Wins; L = Losses; ERA = Earned run average; SO = Strikeouts

Other pitchers 
Note: G = Games pitched; IP = Innings pitched; W = Wins; L = Losses; ERA = Earned run average; SO = Strikeouts

Notes

References 
1903 Chicago White Stockings team page at Baseball Reference
Chicago White Stockings team page at www.baseball-almanac.com

Chicago White Sox seasons
Chicago White Stockings season
Chicago White